Mool Chand Daga (1918 – March 1987) was an Indian politician. He was elected to the Lok Sabha, the lower house of the Parliament of India from Pali, Rajasthan as a member of the Indian National Congress.

Daga died in office in March 1987. The Lok Sabha was adjourned for the day on 11 March as a mark of respect.

References

External links
  Official biographical sketch in Parliament of India website

1918 births
1987 deaths
India MPs 1971–1977
India MPs 1980–1984
India MPs 1984–1989
Indian National Congress politicians
Lok Sabha members from Rajasthan
People from Pali district